Upper Saddle River is a borough in Bergen County, in the U.S. state of New Jersey. As of the 2020 United States census, the borough's population was 8,353, an increase of 145 (+1.8%) from the 2010 census count of 8,208, which in turn reflected an increase of 467 (+6.0%) from the 7,741 counted in the 2000 census.

Upper Saddle River had a per capita income of $73,639 and was ranked 20th in New Jersey based on data from the 2006–2010 American Community Survey (ACS) from the United States Census Bureau, more than double the statewide average of $34,858. In the 2013–2017 ACS, Upper Saddle River had a median household income of $176,674 (ranked 8th in the state) and included 42.9% of households earning more than $200,000 annually.

History
Upper Saddle River was originally settled by the Lenape Native Americans and was colonized in the 18th century principally by Dutch settlers who built mills along the Saddle River. The area was granted borough status in 1894 and remained principally rural until the 1950s. The suburban growth of New Jersey affected Upper Saddle River and surrounding municipalities, as the borough's population increased tenfold from 1950 to 1970. The population has remained fairly constant since 1970.

Predominantly a residential community consisting of one-acre (4,000 m2) lots, Upper Saddle River also contains a library, police station, fire station, ambulance corps, municipal hall, and three primary schools. Commerce and industry are concentrated along the town's western border along Route 17. Postal service is shared with the neighboring borough of Saddle River.

Upper Saddle River was formed as a borough by an act of the New Jersey Legislature on November 22, 1894, from portions of Hohokus Township and Orvil Township, based on the results of a referendum held two days earlier. The borough was formed during the "Boroughitis" phenomenon then sweeping through Bergen County, in which 26 boroughs were formed in the county in 1894 alone. Upper Saddle River's referendum passed on November 20, one day after the referendum passed for Saddle River. The name of the river, and hence the borough, is thought to come from early explorers who thought that the geography of the area resembled that of the Sadle Burn, the valley surrounding a stream in the Scottish area of Argyll.

Geography
According to the United States Census Bureau, the borough had a total area of 5.27 square miles (13.66 km2), including 5.25 square miles (13.60 km2) of land and 0.02 square miles (0.05 km2) of water (0.38%). The borough is bisected by the Saddle River, a tributary of the Passaic River.

Unincorporated communities, localities and place names located partially or completely within the township include Duffys Mills, Hoppers Mills and Posts Mills.

Upper Saddle River is bounded by seven municipalities: Mahwah, Montvale, Ramsey, Saddle River, as well as small portions of Woodcliff Lake in Bergen County, New Jersey; and both Airmont and Chestnut Ridge in the Town of Ramapo in Rockland County, New York.

The borough is served by several major highways, including the Garden State Parkway at exits 172 and 171 in Montvale and Woodcliff Lake, and Route 17, which runs through the borough, though some portions of Upper Saddle River are served by roads located in Saddle River, Ramsey and Mahwah.

Demographics

2010 census

The Census Bureau's 2006–2010 American Community Survey showed that (in 2010 inflation-adjusted dollars) median household income was $175,399 (with a margin of error of +/− $22,259) and the median family income was $179,241 (+/− $47,207). Males had a median income of $160,795 (+/− $24,471) versus $67,885 (+/− $27,436) for females. The per capita income for the borough was $73,639 (+/− $8,085). About 1.5% of families and 1.4% of the population were below the poverty line, including 1.4% of those under age 18 and 1.5% of those age 65 or over.

Same-sex couples headed 13 households in 2010, an increase from the 12 counted in 2000.

2000 census
As of the 2000 United States census there were 7,741 people, 2,497 households, and 2,242 families residing in the borough. The population density was 1,462.7 people per square mile (565.0/km2). There were 2,560 housing units at an average density of 483.7 per square mile (186.8/km2). The racial makeup of the borough was 91.24% White, 0.93% African American, 0.03% Native American, 6.28% Asian, 0.01% Pacific Islander, 0.52% from other races, and 0.99% from two or more races. Hispanic or Latino of any race were 2.18% of the population.

There were 2,497 households, out of which 47.1% had children under the age of 18 living with them, 83.6% were married couples living together, 4.4% had a female householder with no husband present, and 10.2% were non-families. 8.4% of all households were made up of individuals, and 3.9% had someone living alone who was 65 years of age or older. The average household size was 3.09 and the average family size was 3.27.

In the borough the population was spread out, with 30.7% under the age of 18, 3.8% from 18 to 24, 25.1% from 25 to 44, 29.0% from 45 to 64, and 11.4% who were 65 years of age or older. The median age was 40 years. For every 100 females, there were 97.1 males. For every 100 females age 18 and over, there were 95.0 males.

The median income for a household in the borough was $127,635, and the median income for a family was $132,401. Males had a median income of $100,000 versus $51,587 for females. The per capita income for the borough was $57,239. None of the families and 0.7% of the population were living below the poverty line, including no under eighteens and 2.1% of those over 64.

Economy
Pearson Education (formerly Prentice Hall), a scholastic division of Pearson was headquartered in Upper Saddle River until late 2015.

Onkyo USA is headquartered in Upper Saddle River.

The North American headquarters of Hunter Douglas are located in the borough.

Parks and recreation 
Parks in the borough include:
 Hess Park – located on Hess Court, the park has athletic fields and a playground
 Lions Memorial Park – located on Lake Street, this park has athletic playing fields, walking paths, and a playground. This park was built and funded by the Saddle River Valley Lions Club. The park is also home to the annual Saddle River Valley Lions Club carnival; held every year on Memorial Day weekend.
 Liberty Pond Park – located on Hopper Farm Road, this park has a gazebo and swing benches, as guests view the West Branch Saddle River pond.

Government

Local government
Upper Saddle River is governed under the borough form of New Jersey municipal government, which is used in 218 municipalities (of the 564) statewide, making it the most common form of government in New Jersey. The governing body is composed of a Mayor and a Borough Council comprising six council members, with all positions elected at-large. A Mayor is elected directly by the voters to a four-year term of office. The Borough Council is composed of six members elected to serve three-year terms on a staggered basis, with two seats coming up for election each year in a three-year cycle. The Borough form of government used by Upper Saddle River is a "weak mayor / strong council" government in which council members act as the legislative body with the mayor presiding at meetings and voting only in the event of a tie. The mayor can veto ordinances subject to an override by a two-thirds majority vote of the council. The mayor makes committee and liaison assignments for council members, and most appointments are made by the mayor with the advice and consent of the council.

, the mayor is Republican Arman Fardanesh, who was appointed to fill a vacant seat with a term expiring December 31, 2023. Members of the Borough Council are Council President Jonathan W. Ditkoff (R, 2025), Steven F. DiMartino (R, 2023), Sarah Drennan (R, 2025), Joanne Florio (R, 2024), Richard Lyons (R, 2024); appointed to serve an unexpired term) and Roger Masi (R, 2023; elected to serve an unexpired term of office).

Mayor Joanne Minichetti resigned from office in October 2022 over issues related to the construction of a sports facility in the borough. Councilmember Arman Fardanesh was appointed in November to fill Minichetti's vacant seat expiring in December 2023. In December, Richard Lyons was appointed to Fardanesh's vacant council seat expiring in December 2024.

In July 2021, the Borough Council appointed Sarah Drennan to occupy the seat expiring in December 2022 that became vacant following the resignation of Douglas Rotella. In the November 2021 general election, Drennan was elected to serve the remainder of the term of office.

In March 2019, the Borough Council selected Douglas Rotella from a list of three candidates nominated by the Republican municipal committee to fill the seat expiring in December 2019 that had been held by Thomas H. Hafner until he resigned from office the previous month.

Federal, state and county representation
Upper Saddle River is located in the 5th Congressional District and is part of New Jersey's 39th state legislative district.

Politics
As of March 2011, there were a total of 5,587 registered voters in Upper Saddle River, of which 996 (17.8% vs. 31.7% countywide) were registered as Democrats, 1,840 (32.9% vs. 21.1%) were registered as Republicans and 2,746 (49.1% vs. 47.1%) were registered as Unaffiliated. There were 5 voters registered as Libertarians or Greens. Among the borough's 2010 Census population, 68.1% (vs. 57.1% in Bergen County) were registered to vote, including 98.1% of those ages 18 and over (vs. 73.7% countywide).

In the 2016 presidential election, Republican Donald Trump received 2,350 votes (52.7% vs. 41.1% countywide), ahead of Democrat Hillary Clinton with 1,945 votes (43.6% vs. 54.2%) and other candidates with 161 votes (3.6% vs. 4.6%), among the 4,510 ballots cast by the borough's 6,330 registered voters, for a turnout of 71.3% (vs. 72.5% in Bergen County). In the 2012 presidential election, Republican Mitt Romney received 2,726 votes (65.3% vs. 43.5% countywide), ahead of Democrat Barack Obama with 1,405 votes (33.7% vs. 54.8%) and other candidates with 22 votes (0.5% vs. 0.9%), among the 4,174 ballots cast by the borough's 5,987 registered voters, for a turnout of 69.7% (vs. 70.4% in Bergen County). In the 2008 presidential election, Republican John McCain received 2,565 votes (58.1% vs. 44.5% countywide), ahead of Democrat Barack Obama with 1,788 votes (40.5% vs. 53.9%) and other candidates with 29 votes (0.7% vs. 0.8%), among the 4,415 ballots cast by the borough's 5,648 registered voters, for a turnout of 78.2% (vs. 76.8% in Bergen County). In the 2004 presidential election, Republican George W. Bush received 2,671 votes (61.5% vs. 47.2% countywide), ahead of Democrat John Kerry with 1,635 votes (37.6% vs. 51.7%) and other candidates with 24 votes (0.6% vs. 0.7%), among the 4,345 ballots cast by the borough's 5,319 registered voters, for a turnout of 81.7% (vs. 76.9% in the whole county).

In the 2013 gubernatorial election, Republican Chris Christie received 78.0% of the vote (1,817 cast), ahead of Democrat Barbara Buono with 21.2% (493 votes), and other candidates with 0.8% (19 votes), among the 2,369 ballots cast by the borough's 5,699 registered voters (40 ballots were spoiled), for a turnout of 41.6%. In the 2009 gubernatorial election, Republican Chris Christie received 1,830 votes (63.8% vs. 45.8% countywide), ahead of Democrat Jon Corzine with 899 votes (31.3% vs. 48.0%), Independent Chris Daggett with 115 votes (4.0% vs. 4.7%) and other candidates with 9 votes (0.3% vs. 0.5%), among the 2,869 ballots cast by the borough's 5,620 registered voters, yielding a 51.0% turnout (vs. 50.0% in the county).

Education
Public school students in pre-kindergarten through eighth grade attend the Upper Saddle River School District. As of the 2018–19 school year, the district, comprised of three schools, had an enrollment of 1,133 students and 108.5 classroom teachers (on an FTE basis), for a student–teacher ratio of 10.4:1. The schools in the district (with 2018–19 enrollment data from the National Center for Education Statistics) are 
Robert D. Reynolds Primary School with 326 students in grades Pre-K–2, 
Edith A. Bogert Elementary School with 377 students in grades 3–5 and 
Emil A. Cavallini Middle School with 414 students in grades 6–8.

For high school, public school students in Upper Saddle River for ninth through twelfth grades attend Northern Highlands Regional High School, which also serves students from Allendale and Ho-Ho-Kus, along with some of Saddle River's students (who have the option of attending either Northern Highlands or Ramsey High School, as part of sending/receiving relationships with the two districts). As of the 2019–2020 school year, the high school had an enrollment of 1,400 students and 111.9 classroom teachers (on an FTE basis), for a student–teacher ratio of 12.5:1. New Jersey Monthly magazine ranked Northern Highlands Regional High School as the 22nd-best high school of the 328 ranked schools in New Jersey in its 2012 rankings of the "Top Public High Schools" after being ranked 6th of 322 schools in 2010. The ten voting seats on the high school district's board of education are allocated based on a percentage of the enrollment coming from each constituent municipality, with five seats allocated to Upper Saddle River.

Public school students from the borough, and all of Bergen County, are eligible to attend the secondary education programs offered by the Bergen County Technical Schools, which include the Bergen County Academies in Hackensack, and the Bergen Tech campus in Teterboro or Paramus. The district offers programs on a shared-time or full-time basis, with admission based on a selective application process and tuition covered by the student's home school district.

Rodie Child Care Center, run by the YWCA of Bergen County, is open to children from 6 weeks old to 6 years old, including an all-day private Kindergarten class, and is located on Pleasant Avenue.

Transportation

Roads and highways

Route 17, West Saddle River Road, East Saddle River Road, and Lake Street are the main roads in Upper Saddle River.

Public transportation
Short Line offers limited service from stops on Lake Street and Saddle River Road between the borough and the Port Authority Bus Terminal in Midtown Manhattan.

Notable people

People who were born in, residents of, or otherwise closely associated with Upper Saddle River include:

 Kristie Ahn (born 1992), professional tennis player
 Jim Bankoff (born 1969), Chairman and CEO of Vox Media and a senior advisor for Providence Equity Partners
 Beth Beglin (born 1957), field hockey player who represented the United States three times at the Summer Olympics
 Joe Cinderella (1927–2012), jazz guitarist
 Harold Dow (1947–2010), television news correspondent, journalist and investigative reporter with CBS News
 Wes Ellis (1932–1984), professional golfer
 Jay Feely (born 1976), professional NFL kicker who played for the New York Jets
 Michael Ray Garvin (born 1986), wide receiver for the Las Vegas Locomotives
 George Gately (1928–2001), cartoonist who was creator of the popular Heathcliff comic strip
 Edward H. Hynes (born 1946), politician who served two terms in the New Jersey General Assembly
 Kristine Johnson (born 1972), co-anchor at WCBS-TV in New York City
 Margaret Juntwait (–2015), the voice of the Metropolitan Opera radio broadcasts
 Jason Kidd (born 1973), head coach of the Milwaukee Bucks
 Vincent Lamberti (–2014), lab researcher whose work resulted in 118 patents, most notably the development of Dove soap
 Tomas J. Padilla, politician who served on the Bergen County Board of Chosen Freeholders and has served as Borough Administrator in Woodcliff Lake
 Bill Parcells (born 1941), NFL head coach for the New York Giants during the 1990s
 Jason Patric (born 1966 as Jason Patric Miller), actor who has appeared in The Lost Boys and Sleepers
 Kevin J. Rooney (born 1960), politician who represents the 40th Legislative District in the New Jersey General Assembly
 Gary Stein (born 1933), attorney and former Associate Justice of the New Jersey Supreme Court, who served for 17 years where he wrote over 365 published opinions
 Lawrence Taylor (born 1959), retired Hall of Fame American football player
 Ron Villone (born 1970), pitcher who played for the New York Yankees and 11 other teams during his MLB career
 Roy White (born 1943), professional baseball player who played for the New York Yankees
 George Young (1930–2001), American football player, coach and executive who served as the general manager of the New York Giants from 1979 to 1997
 Matthew Ziff (born 1991), actor and producer

References

Sources 

 Municipal Incorporations of the State of New Jersey (according to Counties) prepared by the Division of Local Government, Department of the Treasury (New Jersey); December 1, 1958.
 Clayton, W. Woodford; and Nelson, William. History of Bergen and Passaic Counties, New Jersey, with Biographical Sketches of Many of its Pioneers and Prominent Men., Philadelphia: Everts and Peck, 1882.
 Harvey, Cornelius Burnham (ed.), Genealogical History of Hudson and Bergen Counties, New Jersey. New York: New Jersey Genealogical Publishing Co., 1900.
 Van Valen, James M. History of Bergen County, New Jersey. New York: New Jersey Publishing and Engraving Co., 1900.
 Westervelt, Frances A. (Frances Augusta), 1858–1942, History of Bergen County, New Jersey, 1630–1923, Lewis Historical Publishing Company, 1923.

External links

 Upper Saddle River Today – community website
 Upper Saddle River Public Schools
 
 Data for Upper Saddle River Public Schools, National Center for Education Statistics
 Northern Highlands Regional High School

 
1894 establishments in New Jersey
Borough form of New Jersey government
Boroughs in Bergen County, New Jersey
Populated places established in 1894